An international financial institution (IFI) is a financial institution that has been established (or chartered) by more than one country, and hence is subject to international law. Its owners or shareholders are generally national governments, although other international institutions and other organizations occasionally figure as shareholders. The most prominent IFIs are creations of multiple nations, although some bilateral financial institutions (created by two countries) exist and are technically IFIs. The best known IFIs were established after World War II to assist in the reconstruction of Europe and provide mechanisms for international cooperation in managing the global financial system.

Types

Multilateral Development Banks

A multilateral development bank (MDB) is a development bank, created by a group of countries, that provides financing and professional advice to enhance development. An MDB has many members, including developed donor countries and developing borrower countries.  MDBs finance projects through long-term loans at market rates, very-long-term loans below market rates (also known as credits), and grants.

The following are usually classified as the main MDBs:
 World Bank
European Investment Bank (EIB)
 Islamic Development Bank (IsDB)
 Asian Development Bank (ADB)
 European Bank for Reconstruction and Development (EBRD)
 CAF - Development Bank of Latin America (CAF)
 Inter-American Development Bank Group (IDB, IADB)
 African Development Bank (AfDB)
New Development Bank (NDB)
 Asian Infrastructure Investment Bank (AIIB)
 Arab Petroleum Investments Corporation (APICORP)
 Eastern and Southern African Trade and Development Bank (TDB)
There are also several "sub-regional" multilateral development banks. Their membership typically includes only borrowing nations. The banks lend to their members, borrowing from the international capital markets. Because there is effectively shared responsibility for repayment, the banks can often borrow more cheaply than could any one member nation.  These banks include:
 Caribbean Development Bank (CDB)
 Central American Bank for Economic Integration (CABEI)
 East African Development Bank (EADB)
 West African Development Bank (BOAD)
 Black Sea Trade and Development Bank (BSTDB)
 Economic Cooperation Organization Trade and Development Bank (ETDB)
 Eurasian Development Bank (EDB)
North American Development Bank (Nadbank)

There are also several multilateral financial institutions (MFIs).  MFIs are similar to MDBs but they are sometimes separated since they have more limited memberships and often focus on financing certain types of projects.
 European Commission (EC)
 International Finance Facility for Immunisation (IFFIm)
 International Fund for Agricultural Development (IFAD)
 Nordic Investment Bank (NIB)
 OPEC Fund for International Development
 Nederlandse Financieringsmaatschappij voor Ontwikkelingslanden NV (FMO)
 International Bank for Economic Co-operation (IBEC)
 International Investment Bank (IIB)
 Arab Bank for Economic Development in Africa (BADEA)

Bretton Woods institutions 

The best-known IFIs were established after World War II to assist in the reconstruction of Europe and provide mechanisms for international cooperation in managing the global financial system. They include the World Bank, the IMF, and the International Finance Corporation. Today the largest IFI in the world is the European Investment Bank which lent 61 billion euros to global projects in 2011.

Regional development banks
The regional development banks consist of several regional institutions that have functions similar to the World Bank group's activities, but with particular focus on a specific region. Shareholders usually consist of the regional countries plus the major donor countries. The best-known of these regional banks cover regions that roughly correspond to United Nations regional groupings, including the Inter-American Development Bank, the Asian Development Bank; the African Development Bank;  the Central American Bank for Economic Integration; and the European Bank for Reconstruction and Development. The Islamic Development Bank is among the leading multilateral development banks. IsDB is the only multilateral development bank after the World Bank that is global in terms of its membership. 56 member countries of IsDB are spread over Asia, Africa, Europe and Latin America.

Bilateral development banks and agencies
A bilateral development bank is a financial institution set up by one individual country to finance development projects in a developing country and its emerging market, hence the term bilateral, as opposed to multilateral. Examples include:
 the Netherlands Development Finance Company FMO, headquarters in The Hague; one of the largest bilateral development banks worldwide.
 the DEG German Investment Corporation or Deutsche Investitions- und Entwicklungsgesellschaft, headquartered in Cologne, Germany.
 the French Development Agency, and Caisse des dépôts, founded 1816, both headquartered in Paris, France.
 the CDC Group, is a development finance institution owned by the UK Government headquartered in London.

Other regional financial institutions
Financial institutions of neighboring countries established themselves internationally to pursue and finance activities in areas of mutual interest; most of them are central banks, followed by development and investment banks. The table below lists some of them in chronological order of when they were founded or listed as functioning as a legal entity. Some institutions were conceived and started working informally 2 decades before their legal inception (e.g. the South East Asian Central Banks Centre)

See also

 Climate Investment Funds
 Development finance institution
 Financial Stability Board
 Global financial system
 National development bank

References

External links
Dataset on all official international lending (230,000 loans, grants and guarantees) by states and multilateral institutions over the period 1790-2015.
Bank Information Center
 World Bank page describing MDBs

 
Supranational banks
International development
Multilateral development banks